Moffett Park is a light rail station operated by Santa Clara Valley Transportation Authority (VTA), located in Sunnyvale, California.  Moffett Park was built as an infill station. This station is served by the Orange Line of the VTA Light Rail system. Technology Corners at Moffett Park, an office building occupied by Google, is located adjacent to Moffett Park station. The station has 93 parking bays located on the north side of the tracks within the Google complex, entry off of 11th Ave.

Service

Location
The station has split platforms north of Moffett Park Drive and east of Enterprise Way (formerly H Street) in Sunnyvale, California.

Station layout

References

External links

VTA - Moffett Park Station
Map of service in Fall 1999 - Moffett Park station is omitted and nonexistent

Santa Clara Valley Transportation Authority light rail stations
Transportation in Sunnyvale, California
Railway stations in the United States opened in 1999
1999 establishments in California